The Club Saint-Germain was a jazz club located at 13 rue Saint-Benoît in the 6e arrondissement de Paris.

History
The club was opened in 1947 by Freddie Chauvelot, Christian Casadesus, Paul Lavigne, Marc Doelnitz, and Boris Vian. Throughout the 1940s, 1950s, and 1960s, it booked leading figures in the French jazz scene such as Barney Wilen, René Urtreger, Django Reinhardt, Stéphane Grappelli, and Pierre Michelot. Many visiting Americans played in the club, including Miles Davis, Art Blakey, and Kenny Dorham, along with Bud Powell and Kenny Clarke, who settled in Paris for longer periods. From 1959, the main European rival was the Jazzhus Montmartre in Copenhagen.

The building of the defunct Club Saint-Germain used to be home to the supper club Bilboquet.

Live recordings
Barney Wilen – Barney (RCA)
Art Blakey – Art Blakey et les Jazz-Messengers au Club St. Germain, vol. 1-2 (RCA)
Bobby Jaspar – Modern Jazz au Club Saint Germain (Barclay)

See also
 List of supper clubs

References

 Gourse, Leslie. "Jazz Liberates Paris". American Heritage Magazine, April 2000. Volume 51, Issue 2.

Jazz clubs in Paris
Defunct jazz clubs
Music venues completed in 1947
Supper clubs